Mount Jukes may refer to:
Mount Jukes (Queensland)
Mount Jukes (Tasmania)